Mericella is a genus of sea snails, marine gastropod mollusks in the family Cancellariidae, the nutmeg snails.

Species
Species within the genus Mericella include:
 Mericella alvesi (Lima, Barros & Petit, 2007)
 Mericella bozzettii Petit & Harasewych, 1993
 Mericella jucunda (Thiele, 1925)
 Mericella paschalis (Thiele, 1925)
 Mericella rosadoi Verhecken, 2020
 Mericella zhangsupingae S.-Q. Zhang & P. Wei, 2018
Species brought into synonymy
 Mericella cingulata (Olsson & Bayer, 1972): synonym of Gerdiella cingulata Olsson & Bayer, 1973
 Mericella corbicula (Dall, 1908): synonym of Gerdiella corbicula (Dall, 1908)
 Mericella gerda Olsson & Bayer, 1972: synonym of Gerdiella gerda Olsson & Bayer, 1973
 Mericella santa Olsson & Bayer, 1972: synonym of Gerdiella santa Olsson & Bayer, 1973

References

 Thiele, J. (1929-1935). Handbuch der systematischen Weichtierkunde. Jena, Gustav Fischer, 1154 pp.
 Verhecken A. (2020). New and poorly known species of Cancellariidae (Neogastropoda: Cancellarioidea) from the Indian Ocean and the western Pacific. Gloria Maris. 59(2): 40-89.

Cancellariidae